She Phoksundo is a rural municipality located in Dolpa District of Karnali Province of Nepal.

The rural municipality is divided into a total of nine wards. The headquarters of the rural municipality is situated at Saldang.

Demographics
At the time of the 2011 Nepal census, 56.7% of the population in She Phoksundo Rural Municipality spoke Sherpa, 23.3% Kham, 17.6% Gurung, 1.4% Nepali and 0.6% Tamang as their first language; 0.4% spoke other languages.

In terms of ethnicity/caste, 76.7% were Dolpo, 17.8% Gurung, 2.9% Tamang, 0.9% Bhote, 0.4% Chhetri, 0.4% Magar and 0.9% others.

In terms of religion, 97.1% were Buddhist, 2.5% Hindu and 0.4% Bon.

References

External links
 Official website

Populated places in Dolpa District
Rural municipalities in Karnali Province
Rural municipalities of Nepal established in 2017